The 2014–15 Granada CF season was the club's 83rd season in its history and its 21st in the top-tier.

Season overview

June

July

August

September

October

November

December

January

February

March

April

May

Squad
As 3 November 2014.

Transfers

Transfer In

Transfer out

Pre-season and friendlies

Competitions

Overall

La Liga

League table

Results summary

Results by round

Matches
Kickoff times are in CET and CEST

Copa del Rey

Round of 32

Round of 16

Statistics

Appearances and goals
Updated as of 30 May 2015. 

|-
! colspan=14 style=background:#dcdcdc; text-align:center| Players who have made an appearance or had a squad number this season but have been loaned out or transferred

|}

Goals
Updated as of 30 May 2015.

Discipline

References

External links

Granada CF seasons
Granada CF